Edward Louis Frossard  CBE was an Anglican priest in  the mid 20th century.

He was born on 22 February 1887, educated at Durham University and ordained in 1913. After a curacy at Penkridge he was a Chaplain to the Forces during World War I. He was Rector of Saint Sampson, Guernsey from 1918 to 1965; and  Dean of Guernsey from 1947 to 1967.

He died on 13 August 1968.

References

1887 births
Alumni of University College, Durham
Commanders of the Order of the British Empire
Guernsey Anglicans
Church of England deans
Deans of Guernsey
1968 deaths
World War I chaplains
Royal Army Chaplains' Department officers